is a Japanese former cyclist. He competed in the team pursuit event at the 1988 Summer Olympics.

References

1962 births
Living people
Japanese male cyclists
Olympic cyclists of Japan
Cyclists at the 1988 Summer Olympics
Sportspeople from Fukushima Prefecture